The Gevatron (Hebrew: הגבעטרון) is an Israeli Kibbutz folk singers group. The band started off in the early days of the state of Israel and are active to this very day. They are considered a unique phenomenon in the Israeli folk songs scene, and in 2007 won the Israel Prize for Lifetime Achievement.

History
The band was founded in 1948 from the youth of Geva Kibbutz in the Jezreel Valley, in honor of the inauguration ceremony of the kibbutz basketball court, and to this very day it is still made up from Geva Kibbutz members and a number of members of the kibbutzim of Beit HaShita, Kfar HaHoresh, the communities of Moledet, Kfar Tavor and Timrat and the city of Afula, sing it voluntarily. The group members have their primary occupation outside the band, and the band is their secondary occupation. Members' age ranges between forty plus to seventy plus, and includes an electrician, teachers, a bakery owner, industrial workers, banquet hall manager, car mechanic and a nurse. Gevatron recorded many albums and held thousands of concerts in Israel and Jewish communities abroad, which won them success.

Albums
1961 Le'an Noshevet Haruach
1961 Shibolei Paz
1965 Male Cos Yain Adom
1965 Zemer shel Tiul
1971 Emek Sheli
1975 Shirei Hanoar Haoved Vehalomed
1976 Zemer Im Hagevatron
1978 Shirim Mehof El Hof
1978 Gvanim, Silver & Golden Record
1980 Shirim Yafim, Silver & Golden Record
1983 Lecol Adam Yesh Shir
1985 El Haderech, Golden Record
1987 Mikol Halev, Golden Record
1988 Ahar Katzir-Neomi Shemer Songs
1988 Shirim Leorech Haderech
1991 Shnot Yaldut
1992 Hemdat Haemek, Nahum Heyman Songs
1993 Emek Sheli
1994 Yam Tichoni
1994 Yam Hashibolim
1998 Shuv Yotze Hazemer
1998 Hamishim Shnot Zemer '48-'98
2000 Osef Hagevatron
1990 Rahok Rahok
2003 Lashir Im Hagevatron, Show in Tzavta
2007 Shirei Reshit Haderech, with Nahche
2008 Giva Ahat, Gevatron is 60 years old

External links
The Gevatron official website

References

Israeli folk music groups
Israel Prize for lifetime achievement & special contribution to society recipients
Musical groups established in 1948